Sphenomorphus bacboensis  is a species of skink found in Vietnam.

References

bacboensis
Reptiles described in 2003
Taxa named by Valery Konstantinovich Eremchenko
Reptiles of Vietnam